José Luciano Costa da Silva (born 19 February 2000) is a Brazilian handball player for S.L. Benfica and the Brazilian national team.

He participated at the 2021 World Men's Handball Championship.

Honours
Benfica
EHF European League: 2021–22

References

2000 births
Living people
Brazilian male handball players
21st-century Brazilian people